NC10, NC-10, or similar, may refer to:

 North Carolina's 10th congressional district
 North Carolina Highway 10
 Samsung NC10
NC10 phylum, a bacterial phylum